Robert Erskine Childers DSC (25 June 1870 – 24 November 1922), usually known as Erskine Childers, was an English-born Irish writer, politician, and militant. His works included the influential novel The Riddle of the Sands. Starting as an ardent Unionist, he later became a supporter of Irish Republicanism and smuggled guns into Ireland in his sailing yacht Asgard. He was executed by the authorities of the nascent Irish Free State during the Irish Civil War. He was the son of British Orientalist scholar Robert Caesar Childers; the cousin of Hugh Childers and Robert Barton; and the father of the fourth President of Ireland, Erskine Hamilton Childers.

Early life
Childers was born in Mayfair, London, in 1870. He was the second son of Robert Caesar Childers, a translator and oriental scholar from an ecclesiastical family, and Anna Mary Henrietta Barton, from an Anglo-Irish landowning family of Glendalough House, Annamoe, County Wicklow, with interests in France such as the winery that bears their name.  When Erskine was six, his father died from tuberculosis and, although seemingly healthy, Anna was confined to an isolation hospital, where she died six years later. The five children were sent to the Bartons, the family of their mother's uncle, at Glendalough, County Wicklow. They were treated kindly there and Erskine grew up knowing and loving Ireland, albeit at that stage from the comfortable viewpoint of the "Protestant Ascendancy". According to his biographer Michael Hopkinson, it was the personal tension caused by his innate belief in English  superiority, in conflict with this new respect for Ireland, which later caused his  remarkable conversion to "hard-line Irish republicanism".

At the recommendation of his grandfather, Canon Charles Childers, he was sent to Haileybury College. There he won an exhibition to Trinity College, Cambridge, where he studied the classical tripos and then law. He distinguished himself as the editor of Cambridge Review, the university magazine. Notwithstanding his unattractive voice and poor debating skills, he became president of the Trinity College Debating Society (the "Magpie and Stump" society). Although Erskine was an admirer of his cousin Hugh Childers, a member of the British Cabinet working for Irish home rule, at this stage he spoke vehemently against the policy in college debates. A sciatic injury sustained while hillwalking in the summer before he went up, and which was to dog him for the rest of his life, left him slightly lame and he was unable to pursue his intention of earning a rugby blue, but he became a proficient rower.

Having gained his degree in law, and planning to one day follow his cousin Hugh into the British Parliament as an MP, Childers sat the competitive entry examination to become a parliamentary official, and early in 1895 he became a junior committee clerk in the House of Commons, with responsibility for preparing formal and legally sound bills from the proposals of the government of the day.

Sailing

With many sporting ventures now closed to him because of his sciatic injury, Childers was encouraged by Walter Runciman, a friend from schooldays, to take up sailing. After picking up the fundamentals of seamanship as a deckhand on Runciman's yacht, in 1893 he bought his own "scrubby little yacht" Shulah, which he learned to sail alone on the Thames Estuary. He sold the Shulah in 1895 to a Plymouth man following a trip around the Lizard in a heavyish sea.

In 1894, while he was living in Glendalough, he bought a Dublin Bay Water Wag, a 13-foot type of sailing boat usually sailed in Dún Laoghaire, pear-shaped with a single gaff-rigged sail. He sailed this boat on Lough Dan, close to Glendalough, and he and his brother Henry used to take friends for a sail in the Water Wag. Bigger and better boats followed: by 1895 he was taking the half-deck Marguerite across the Channel and in 1897 there was a long cruise to the Frisian Islands, Norderney and the Baltic with Henry in the thirty-foot cutter Vixen.

These were the adventures he was to fictionalise in 1903 as The Riddle of the Sands, his most famous book and a huge bestseller. In 1903, Childers, now accompanied by his new wife Molly Osgood, was again cruising in the Frisian Islands, in Sunbeam, a boat he shared with William le Fanu and other friends from his university days. Molly's father, Dr. Hamilton Osgood, arranged for a fine 28-ton yacht, Asgard, to be built for the couple as a wedding gift and Sunbeam was only a temporary measure while Asgard was being fitted out.

Asgard was Childers's last and most famous yacht: in June 1914, he used it to smuggle a cargo of 900 Mauser Model 1871 rifles and 29,000 black powder cartridges to the Irish Volunteers movement at the fishing village of Howth, County Dublin. (The Asgard was acquired by the Irish government as a sail training vessel in 1961, stored on dry land in the yard of Kilmainham Gaol in 1979, and is now exhibited at The National Museum of Ireland.)

War service

Boer War

As with most men of his social background and education, Childers was originally a steadfast believer in the British Empire. Indeed, for an old boy of Haileybury, a school founded to train young men for colonial service in India, such an outlook on Childers's part was understandable, although, privately, he did not accept completely the moral values of the school.

In 1898, as negotiations over the voting rights of British settlers in the Boer territories of Transvaal and Orange Free State failed and the Boer War broke out, he needed little encouragement when in December Basil Williams, a colleague at Westminster and already a member of the Honourable Artillery Company, suggested that they should enlist together. Childers joined the City Imperial Volunteers, something of an ad hoc force comprising soldiers from different volunteer regiments, but funded by City institutions and provided with the most modern equipment. He was an artilleryman classed as a "spare driver", caring for horses and riding in the ammunition supply train.

The unit set off for South Africa on 2 February 1900; most of the new volunteers, and their officers, were seasick and it largely fell to him to care for the troop's 30 horses. After the three-week voyage it was something of a disappointment that the HAC detachment was initially not used. On 26 June, while escorting a supply train of slow ox-wagons, Childers first came under fire, in three days of skirmishing in defence of the column. However, it was a smartly executed defence of a beleaguered infantry regiment on 3 July that established their worth and more significant engagements followed.

On 24 August, Childers was evacuated from the front line with trench foot to hospital in Pretoria. The seven-day journey happened to be in the company of wounded infantrymen from Cork, Ireland, and Childers noted approvingly how cheerfully loyal to Britain the men were, how resistant they were to any incitement in support of Home Rule, and how they had been let down only by the incompetence of their officers. This is a striking contrast to his attitude by the end of the First World War when conscription in Ireland was under consideration, when he wrote of "young men hopelessly estranged from Britain and ... anxious to die in Ireland for Irish liberty". After a chance meeting with his brother Henry, also suffering from a foot injury, he rejoined his unit, only for it to be dispatched to England on 7 October 1900.

First World War

Childers's attitude to Britain's establishment and politics had become somewhat equivocal by the start of the First World War. He had resigned his membership of the Liberal Party, and with it his hopes of a parliamentary seat, over Britain's concessions to Unionists and a further postponement of Irish self-rule; he had written works critical of British policy in Ireland and in its South African possessions; above all, in July 1914, he had smuggled guns bought in Germany to supply nationalists in Ireland (a response to the April 1914 Ulster Unionists' importation of rifles and ammunition in the Larne gun-running).

This knowledge was not in wide circulation, but neither was it a great secret,  and the official telegram calling Childers to naval service was sent to the Dublin headquarters of the Irish Volunteers, the group to which he had made the delivery. Although in 1914 it could be argued that, in the case of war, the Irish Volunteers might fight on the side of Britain as a means of securing bargaining power in home rule negotiations, these weapons were used against British soldiers, in the Easter Rising of 1916. However, Childers believed that small nations such as Belgium and Serbia would benefit from Britain's defeat of Germany and – as a prospectively independent nation – Ireland too would gain.

In mid-August 1914, he again volunteered and received a temporary commission as lieutenant in the Royal Naval Volunteer Reserve. Winston Churchill, the First Lord of the Admiralty, although hostile to spending money on armaments at the time The Riddle of the Sands was published, later gave the book the credit for persuading public opinion to fund vital measures against the German naval threat, and he was instrumental in securing Childers's recall.

His first task was, in reversal of the plot of The Riddle of the Sands, to draw up a plan for the invasion of Germany by way of the Frisian Islands. His duties included flying as a navigator and observer, including a sortie navigating over a familiar coastline in the Cuxhaven Raid, an inconclusive bombing attack on the Cuxhaven airship base on Christmas Day 1914, for which he was mentioned in despatches.

He was sent back to London in April 1916 to receive his decoration from the king and to serve in the Admiralty. His work here included allocating seaplanes to their intended ships. It took Childers until autumn of that year to extricate himself and train for service with a new coastal motor-boat squadron operating in the English Channel.

Irish Convention
In July 1917, the year following the Easter Rising, Sir Horace Plunkett asked for Childers (then a lieutenant-commander in the RNAS serving at a seaplane station st Dunkirk), to be relieved of his operational duties and assigned as secretary to prime minister David Lloyd George's Home Rule Convention. This was an initiative to convene all shades of Irish political opinion to agree a method of government acceptable to all. Plunkett did not have his way, however, as Childers's writings had identified him as a partisan for Home Rule and instead he was appointed as an assistant secretary, with the role of advising the nationalist factions on procedure and presenting their case in formal terms. Talks lasted nine months and at the end Plunkett was obliged to report to the prime minister that no agreement could be reached.

Royal Air Force
On his return to London in April 1918, Childers found himself transferred into the newly created Royal Air Force, with the rank of major. He was attached to the new Independent Bomber Command as a group intelligence officer with the responsibility for preparing the navigational briefings for attacks on Berlin. The raids were forestalled by the Armistice and Childers's last assignment was to provide an intelligence assessment of the effects of bombing raids in Belgium. Childers departed Royal Air Force service on 10 March 1919.

Marriage

In autumn 1903, Childers travelled to the United States as part of a reciprocal visit between the Honourable Artillery Company of London and the Ancient and Honorable Artillery Company of Massachusetts of Boston. Childers had with him a letter of introduction to Dr. Hamilton Osgood, an eminent and wealthy physician in the city, that had been provided by Boston banker Sumner Permain, a friend of Childers's father. Childers was invited to dinner at Osgood's house and there he met Mary Alden Osgood (known as "Molly"), the host's daughter. The well-read republican-minded heiress and Childers found each other congenial company and  Childers elected to extend his stay, with much time shared with Molly. The pair were married at Boston's Trinity Church on 6 January 1904. Cousin Robert Barton travelled to Boston to be best man.

Childers returned to London with his wife and resumed his position in the House of Commons. His reputation as an influential author gave the couple access to the political establishment, which Molly relished, but at the same time she set to work to rid Childers of his already faltering imperialism. In her turn Molly developed a strong admiration for Britain, its institutions and, as she then saw it, its willingness to go to war in the interests of smaller nations against the great. Over the next seven years they lived comfortably in their rented flat in Chelsea, supported by Childers's salary—he had received promotion to the position of parliamentary Clerk of Petitions in 1903—his continuing writings and, not least, generous benefactions from Dr. Osgood.

Molly, despite a severe weakness in the legs following a childhood skating injury, took enthusiastically to sailing, first in the Seagull and later on many voyages in her father's gift, the Asgard. Childers's letters to his wife show the couple's contentment during this time. Three sons were born: Erskine in December 1905, Henry, who died before his first birthday, in February 1907, and Robert Alden in December 1910.

Writing
Childers's first published work was some light detective stories he contributed to the Cambridge Review while he was editor.

In the Ranks of the C.I.V.
His first book was In the Ranks of the C.I.V., an account of his experiences in the Boer War, but he wrote it without any thought of publication: while serving with the Honourable Artillery Company in South Africa he composed many long, descriptive letters about his experiences to his two sisters, Dulcibella and Constance. They and a family friend, Elizabeth Thompson, daughter of George Smith of the publishing house Smith, Elder, edited the letters into book form. The print proofs were waiting for Childers to approve on his return from the war in October 1900 and Smith, Elder published the work in November. It was well-timed to catch the public's interest in the war, which continued until May 1902, and it sold in substantial numbers.

Childers edited his colleague Basil Williams's more formal book, The HAC in South Africa, the official history of the regiment's part in the campaign, for publication in 1903.

The Riddle of the Sands
In January 1901, Childers started work on his novel, The Riddle of the Sands, but initially progress was slow: it was not until winter of that year that he was able to tell Williams, in one of his regular letters, of the outline of the plot. At the end of the following year, after a hard summer of writing, the manuscript went to Reginald Smith at Smith Elder. But in February 1903, just as Childers was hoping to return to The HAC in South Africa, Smith sent back the novel, with instructions for extensive changes. With the help of his sisters, who cross-checked the new manuscript pages against the existing material, Childers produced the final version in time for publication in May 1903. Based on his own sailing trips with his brother Henry along the German coast, it predicted war with Germany and called for British preparedness. There has been much speculation about which of Childers's friends was the model for "Carruthers" in the novel. It seems that he is based not on Henry Childers but on yachting enthusiast Walter Runciman; "Davies", of course, is Childers himself.  Because of The Riddle, Childers was invited to join the Savile Club, then a literary centre in London. Widely popular, the book has never gone out of print and in 2003, several centenary editions were published. The Observer included the book on its list of "The 100 Greatest Novels of All Time".  The Telegraph listed it as the third best spy novel of all time.  It has been called the first spy novel (a claim challenged by advocates of Rudyard Kipling's Kim, published two years earlier), and enjoyed immense popularity in the years before World War I. It was an extremely influential book: Winston Churchill later credited it as a major reason that the Admiralty decided to establish naval bases at Invergordon, Rosyth on the Firth of Forth and Scapa Flow in Orkney. It was also a notable influence on authors such as  John Buchan
and Eric Ambler.

"Cavalry Controversy"
Childers's neighbour, Leo Amery, was editor of The Times History of the War in South Africa, and having already persuaded Basil Williams to write volume four of the work, he used this to persuade Childers to prepare volume five. This profitable commission took up much of Childers's free time until publication in 1907. It drew attention to British political and military errors and made unfavourable contrast with the tactics of the Boer guerrillas.

Motivated by his expectation of war with Germany, Childers wrote two books on cavalry warfare, both strongly critical of what he saw as outmoded British tactics. Everyone agreed that cavalry should be trained to fight dismounted with firearms, but military traditionalists wanted cavalry still to be trained as the arme blanche, bringing shock tactics to bear by charging the enemy with lance and sabre. Childers's War and the Arme Blanche (1910) carried a foreword from Field Marshal Roberts, and recommended that cavalry, instead of charging the enemy positions, should "make genuinely destructive assaults upon riflemen and guns" by firing from the saddle. Traditionalists, including General French, who had commanded successful cavalry charges at the Battle of Elandslaagte and the relief of Kimberley, writing in an unlikely alliance with Prussian general Friedrich von Bernhardi, responded in defence of the old tactics. This allowed Childers to counter with German Influence on British Cavalry (1911), an "intolerant" rejoinder to the criticisms of his book made by French and Bernhardi. Training in the traditional shock tactics was reestablished as Roberts retired, and French and his protégé Major-General Haig were promoted to command of the army.

The Framework for Home Rule
It was as a prospective Liberal Party candidate for Parliament that Childers wrote his last major book: The Framework for Home Rule (1911). Childers's principal argument was an economic one: that an Irish parliament (there would be no Westminster MPs) would be responsible for making fiscal policy, to the benefit of the country, and would hold "dominion" status, in the same detached way in which Canada managed its affairs. His arguments were based in part on the findings of the "Childers Commission" of the 1890s, which was chaired by his cousin, Hugh Childers. Erskine Childers consulted Ulster Unionists in preparing Framework and wrote that their reluctance to accept the policy would easily be overcome. Although, for Childers, it represented a major change from the opinions he had previously held, enacting Irish Home Rule was the Liberal government's policy at the time.

An emerging problem was that the book assumed fiscal independence and self-government for the whole island of Ireland, including the wealthier and more industrialised counties around Belfast. During his research for the book Childers naïvely came to believe that the opposition of the unionists in the region was mainly bluff, or that the industrialists' entrepreneurial spirit would easily overcome any monetary disadvantages they might initially suffer. In this Childers was wrong: this disparity (together with the largely Protestant unionists' fear of Catholic "rule from Rome") was a significant contributor to the failure of the 1917 Home Rule Convention, and ultimately to the Partition of Ireland of 1921.

Conversion
There was no single incident which was responsible for Childers's conversion from supporter of the British Empire to his leading role in the Irish revolution. Rather, there was a growing conviction, later turning to "fanatical obsession", that the island of Ireland should have its own government.

An early source of disillusionment with Britain's imperial policy was his realisation that, given more patient and skilful negotiation, the Boer War could have been avoided. His friend and biographer Basil Williams noticed his growing doubts about Britain's actions in South Africa while they were on campaign together: "Both of us, who came out as hide-bound Tories, began to tend towards more liberal ideas, partly from the ... democratic company we were keeping, but chiefly, I think, from our discussions on politics and life generally."

Molly Childers, brought up in a family that traced its roots to the Mayflower, also influenced her husband's outlook on the right of Britain to rule other countries. The ground was well prepared, then, when in the summer of 1908 he and his cousin Robert Barton took a holiday motor tour inspecting agricultural co-operatives in the south and west of Ireland, areas ravaged with poverty. "I have come back", he wrote to Basil Williams, "finally and immutably a convert to Home Rule ... though we both grew up steeped in the most irreconcilable sort of Unionism."

In the autumn of 1910 Childers resigned his post as Clerk of Petitions to leave himself free to join the Liberal Party, with its declared commitment to Home Rule: the Liberal Party relied on Irish Home Rule MPs for its Commons majority. In May 1912 he secured for himself the candidature in one of the parliamentary seats in the naval town of Devonport. As the well-known writer of The Riddle of the Sands, with its implied support for an expanded Royal Navy, Childers could hardly fail to win the vote whenever the next election was called. But in response to threats of civil war from the Ulster Unionists, the party began to entertain the idea of removing some or all of Ulster from a self-governed Ireland. Childers abandoned his candidacy and left the party.

The Liberals' Home Rule Bill, introduced in 1912, would eventually pass into law in 1914, but was immediately – by a separate Act of Parliament – shelved for the duration of the Great War which had just begun, whilst the Amending Bill to exclude six of the nine counties of Ulster, the duration of whose provisions still remained a matter of debate, was eliminated altogether.

Home Rule
The violent suppression of the Easter Rising in 1916 dismayed Childers and he described a proposed British bill to extend military conscription to Ireland as "insane and criminal". In March 1919, after a severe attack of influenza, his doctors ordered rest in the country. Glendalough was the obvious choice and he joined his cousin Robert Barton there. Barton introduced Childers to the Irish military leader Michael Collins, who in turn introduced him to Éamon de Valera, the President of Sinn Féin. Childers came to believe that his moderate "dominion" proposal would not serve (as he, then Sinn Féin's director of publicity, was to acknowledge in a letter to the United States Department of State dated 21 July 1921).

At the end of his convalescence Childers returned to Molly at the Chelsea flat, but a month later he received an invitation to meet the Sinn Féin leadership in Dublin. Anticipating an offer of a major role, Childers hurried to Dublin but, apart from Collins, he found the Irish leadership wary, or even hostile. Arthur Griffith, in particular, considered him as at best a renegade and traitor to Britain, or at worst as a British spy. He was appointed to join the Irish delegation from the as-yet-unrecognised Irish State to the Paris Peace Conference. This unpromising undertaking, as Childers saw it, was intended to advance the cause of Irish self-rule by reminding official representatives at the conference of the ideals of freedom for which Britain had gone to war. In this they were unsuccessful, and Childers returned once again to London. He rented a house in Dublin, but Molly was reluctant to join him: mindful of her sons' education, and believing that she and her husband could best serve the cause by influencing opinion in London. She eventually gave up their London home of fifteen years to settle in Dublin, at the end of 1919.

In 1919 Childers was made Director of Publicity for the First Irish Parliament. In 1920 Childers published Military Rule in Ireland, a strong attack on British policy. At the 1921 elections, he was elected (unopposed) to the Second Dáil as Sinn Féin member for the Kildare–Wicklow constituency, and published the pamphlet Is Ireland a Danger to England?, which attacked British prime minister David Lloyd George. He became editor of the Irish Bulletin after the arrest of the young Desmond FitzGerald. He stood as an anti-Treaty Sinn Féin candidate at the 1922 general election but lost his seat.

Civil War

Childers was secretary of the Irish delegation that negotiated the Anglo-Irish Treaty with the British Government in London in Autumn 1921. Childers was vehemently opposed to the final draft of the agreement, even when the clauses that required Irish leaders to take the Oath of Allegiance to the British monarch had been redefined to remove any real authority of the Crown in Ireland. As secretary to the delegation (rather than a full delegate) his tenacious resistance to the terms offered by the English were overruled. At the termination of the talks, English negotiator David Lloyd George noted a "sullen" Childers, disappointed that his "sinister" attempts to wreck the negotiations had failed. Biographer Jim Ring's assessment is more generous: many of the English concessions that had permitted the Irish delegation eventually to sign the document had been introduced at Childers's instigation.

The agreement was presented to the Dáil and debated between December 1921 and January 1922. Childers denounced it, declaring that by accepting compromise Ireland had of its own volition relinquished its independence. Arthur Griffith, a member of the London delegation who had pragmatically conceded to England over the Oath of Allegiance, alleged that Childers was a secret agent of England now working to wreck the agreement and destabilise the new state. Nonetheless, the Dáil voted to adopt the agreement by the narrow majority of 64 to 57. 

The Treaty with Britain continued to divide Sinn Féin from the anti-treaty Irish Republican Army (IRA). Ireland descended into civil war on 28 June 1922, when Free State forces, using borrowed British artillery, bombarded the Four Courts, once Ireland's judicial centre but now used as the military headquarters of the IRA.

Fugitive
During the civil war Childers, now on the run with the anti-treaty forces in retreat to County Cork and County Kerry, was producing the IRA news sheet War News. This allowed Kevin O'Higgins, the Irish government's justice minister, to declare that Childers was in fact the leader of the rebels, and indeed nothing less than the instigator of the civil war itself, through his resistance to compromise with England. 

The author Frank O'Connor was involved with Childers during the later part of the Civil War and gave a colourful picture of Childers's activities. According to O'Connor, he was ostracised from the anti-treaty forces and referred to as "That bloody Englishman". The high command of the anti-treaty forces distanced themselves from Childers on the grounds that he was too infamous to be of any practical use, despite his considerable military experience, and at one stage he was put to work addressing letters in the staff office in Macroom, County Cork. He was later described in a memoir by Dan Breen as "Staff-Captain Childers, IRA".

The death in an ambush of Michael Collins intensified the desire of Free State authorities for retribution, and on 28 September 1922, the Dáil introduced the Army Emergency Powers Resolution, establishing martial law powers and listing carrying firearms without a licence a capital offence.

Early in November 1922 Childers decided that the cause would be better served if he were at de Valera's side as he attempted to rally the anti-treaty forces. Accordingly he set off by bicycle on the  journey from Kerry to his old home at Glendalough, as a staging post before meeting De Valera in Dublin. On 10 November Free State forces, possibly informed by an estate worker, burst into the house and arrested him.

Trial and appeal

Childers was put on trial by a military court on the charge of possessing a small Spanish-made "Destroyer" .32 calibre semi-automatic pistol on his person in violation of the Emergency Powers Resolution. The gun had been a gift from Michael Collins before Collins became head of the pro-treaty Provisional Government. Childers was convicted by the military court and sentenced to death on 20 November 1922.

Childers appealed against the sentence, and this was heard the next day by Judge Charles O'Connor, who said he lacked jurisdiction because of the civil war:

Childers's lawyer appealed to the Supreme Court, but before it was ever accepted by the court and listed as an appealable case, he was put to death.

Execution
Childers was executed on 24 November 1922, by firing squad at the Beggars Bush Barracks in Dublin. Before his execution he shook hands with the firing squad. He also obtained a promise from his then 16-year-old son, the future President of Ireland, Erskine Hamilton Childers, to seek out and shake the hand of every man who had signed his death sentence. His final words, spoken to the firing squad, were: "Take a step or two forward, lads, it will be easier that way."

Childers's body was buried at Beggars Bush Barracks until 1923, when it was exhumed and reburied in the republican plot at Glasnevin Cemetery.

Legacy
Winston Churchill, who had exerted pressure on Michael Collins and the Free State government to make the treaty work by crushing the rebellion, expressed the view that, "No man has done more harm or shown more genuine malice or endeavoured to bring a greater curse upon the common people of Ireland than this strange being, actuated by a deadly and malignant hatred for the land of his birth."

Éamon de Valera said of him, "He died the Prince he was. Of all the men I ever met, I would say he was the noblest".

It was the express wish of Molly Childers, upon her death in 1964, that any writings based upon the extensive and meticulous collection of papers and documents from her husband's in-depth involvement with the Irish struggles of the 1920s should be locked away from anyone's eyes until 50 years after his death. In 1972, Erskine Hamilton Childers started the process of finding an official biographer for his father. In 1974, Andrew Boyle (previous biographer of Brendan Bracken and Lord Reith amongst others) was given the task of exploring the vast Childers archive, and his biography of Robert Erskine Childers was finally published in 1977.

Dramatisations
In 1991, Childers was featured in Jonathan Lewis's TV docudrama for Thames Television and RTÉ The Treaty. Bosco Hogan played Childers, alongside Brendan Gleeson as Michael Collins.

In 1998, BBC Radio 3 broadcast in the Drama on 3 slot a play by Leigh Jackson called A Flag Unfurled, based on the life, times and writings of Childers. It featured Michael Maloney as Childers, Deborah Norton as Molly Childers, Natascha McElhone as his sister Dulcie and Laura Hughes as his sister Constance. It was produced in Belfast by Roland Jaquarello.

Late in 2011 production company Black Rock Pictures included the arrest and trial of Childers in its six-part television series Bású na gCarad (The Friends' Execution), broadcast on TG4 in September 2012. Childers was played by Dominic Frisby.

Notes

References

Further reading

 Adams, R.J.Q.: Balfour: The Last Grandee, Jose Vargas, 2007
 
 Coogan, Tim Pat (1993). The IRA: A History, Niwot, Colorado: Roberts Rinehart Publishers. .
 Costello, Peter (1977), The Heart Grown Brutal: The Irish Revolution in Literature from Parnell to the Death of Yeats, 1891–1939, Dublin: Gill & Macmillan. .
 
 
 
  Also known as The tragedy of Erskine Childers.
 
 
 
 
 Wilkinson, Burke, The Zeal of the Convert: The Life of Erskine Childers, Sag Harbor, New York: Second Chance Press, 1985T .

External links 

 
 
 
 
 
 Free ebooks of The Riddle of the Sands and In the Ranks of the C.I.V., optimised for printing, plus selected Childers bibliography
 Childer's rebuttal to the Dail in 1922 that he had served in the British Secret Service.
 
 
 

1870 births
1922 deaths
British non-fiction writers
Early Sinn Féin TDs
People from Mayfair
People educated at Haileybury and Imperial Service College
Alumni of Trinity College, Cambridge
Honourable Artillery Company soldiers
British Army personnel of the Second Boer War
English people of Portuguese-Jewish descent
Recipients of the Distinguished Service Cross (United Kingdom)
People of the Irish Civil War (Anti-Treaty side)
Members of the 2nd Dáil
Burials at Glasnevin Cemetery
Irish Republican Army (1919–1922) members
Irish Republican Army (1922–1969) members
Irish Anglicans
Protestant Irish nationalists
Executed British people
Legion of Frontiersmen members
Executed Irish people
People executed by the Irish Free State
People executed by Ireland by firing squad
Royal Navy officers of World War I
Erskine
20th-century British novelists
British male novelists
20th-century British male writers
Male non-fiction writers